The following highways are numbered 734:

Canada
 Alberta Highway 734
 Saskatchewan Highway 734

Costa Rica
 National Route 734

India
 National Highway 734 (India)

United States
 
 
 
  Virginia State Route 734 (Loudoun County) (Snicker's Gap Turnpike)